Tony Walby (born August 22, 1973) is a Canadian judoka who represented Canada in Judo at the 2012 Paralympics in the +100 kg category and - 90kg division in the 2016 Paralympic Games in Rio. He won his first match, lost his second, and was then eliminated in repêchage.

Walby has been practising Judo since 1980, was a member of the able-bodied Canadian Judo team for 16 years, and won the national heavyweight championship in his last year of competition. He has genetic cone dystrophy, however, which caused his sight to begin deteriorating significantly in his early 20s, and he was declared legally blind around age 35. Two years later he learned that his visual impairment qualifies him to compete in the Paralympics and began training for competition again. In 2011 he won bronze in the +100 kg category of the Parapan American Games. Walby currently trains and coaches at the Takahashi Martial Arts School in Ottawa, Ontario, which was founded by Masao Takahashi. His Paralympic coach is Tom Thompson.

See also
 Judo in Canada
 List of Canadian judoka

References

External links
 
 
 
 

1973 births
Living people
Canadian male judoka
Judoka at the 2012 Summer Paralympics
Judoka at the 2016 Summer Paralympics
Paralympic judoka of Canada
Sportspeople from Ottawa
Medalists at the 2011 Parapan American Games